James P. Bassett (born September 16, 1956) is a justice of the New Hampshire Supreme Court. He graduated from the University of Virginia Law School. He was a candidate for the Republican nomination for New Hampshire's 2nd congressional district in 1994, coming fourth with 14% of the vote.

References

1956 births
Living people
New Hampshire Republicans
Justices of the New Hampshire Supreme Court
Lawyers from Bridgeport, Connecticut
University of Virginia School of Law alumni
21st-century American judges